Seleucia semirosella is a species of snout moth. It is found in Croatia and Greece.

The wingspan is about 20 mm.

References

Moths described in 1887
Anerastiini
Moths of Europe
Taxa named by Émile Louis Ragonot